Martín Yupanqui (born 20 October 1962) is a Peruvian footballer. He played in two matches for the Peru national football team from 1988 to 1996. He was also part of Peru's squad for the 1995 Copa América tournament.

References

External links
 

1962 births
Living people
Peruvian footballers
Peru international footballers
Place of birth missing (living people)
Association football goalkeepers